Carol Jeffrey (31 October 1898 – 6 November 1998) was an English psychotherapist, known for working with children and being one of the original staff members at Open Way Association, which was a group that performed psychotherapy in a revolutionary way. She published her first book at the age of 98.

Early life
She was born Editha Caroline Cowley in White Hall, Worcestershire on 31 October 1898, the daughter of Robert Cowley, who had worked as a designer with William Morris and later as a manager at Liberty in Regent Street, before taking on his parents' farm in Worcestershire.

Education
Jeffrey was home schooled and went on to receive her bachelor's degree from the University of London in 1919. Since her family could not afford to support her through doctoral training, she instead received a teaching diploma in 1920. Later on, she was able to return to school, and received her postgraduate diploma in individual psychology in 1945.

Career
Jeffrey began her career as a music and English teacher. When she got married she left her job, as was the norm at the time. Once she received her postgraduate diploma in individual psychology, she began working in the field of child guidance. She and a colleague both noticed that the rules set for staff got in the way of effective therapy, so her colleague founded the Open Way Association and Jeffrey joined as a psychotherapist. Later on, Jeffrey opened up a private practice. She also worked closely with a colleague of Carl Jung.

Legacy
Carol Jeffrey published a semiautobiography towards the end of her life called That Why Child. This book discussed her perception of the causes of child psychopathology.

References

1898 births
1998 deaths
English educational theorists
English psychotherapists
English writers